Archibald Richardson was the first State Surgeon of Ireland in 1774.

References 

Irish surgeons
Year of birth missing
Year of death missing
Irish health officials